The 9th African Championships in Athletics were held between 23 and 27 June 1993 in Durban, South Africa at Kings Park Stadium.

Medal summary

Men's events

Women's events

Medal table

See also
1993 in athletics (track and field)

External links
Results – GBR Athletics

A
African Championships in Athletics
International athletics competitions hosted by South Africa
African Championships in Athletics
1993 in South African sport
Sports competitions in Durban